Darreh-ye Talkh Rashek (also Romanized as Darreh-ye Talkh Rāshek) is a village in Doshman Ziari Rural District, Doshman Ziari District, Mamasani County, Fars Province, Iran. At the 2006 census, its population was 39, in 9 families.

References 

Populated places in Mamasani County